Adrián 'Adri' Cuevas Algeciras (born 10 January 1990) is a Spanish footballer who plays as a midfielder for AD Ceuta FC.

Club career
Born in Jerez de la Frontera, Province of Cádiz, Cuevas graduated from local Xerez CD's youth system, playing four full seasons with the reserve side. On 27 October 2010 he made his debut for the first team, starting against Levante UD in the round of 32 of the Copa del Rey.

After one more appearance with the main squad, again in the domestic cup and against the same opponent, Cuevas renewed his contract with the Andalusians, his new link running until 30 June 2014. After loan stints with Segunda División B teams Valencia CF Mestalla and San Fernando CD, he joined Córdoba CF B.

On 26 January 2014, Cuevas was loaned to Gimnàstic de Tarragona also in the third division. On 27 August, he moved to Hércules CF of the same league also in a temporary deal.

On 10 August 2015, Cuevas cut ties with Córdoba CF. In the following years, he continued competing in the third tier; the exception to this was the 2020–21 season, spent with CE Sabadell FC in division two.

References

External links

1990 births
Living people
Spanish footballers
Footballers from Jerez de la Frontera
Association football midfielders
Segunda División players
Segunda División B players
Tercera División players
Primera Federación players
Divisiones Regionales de Fútbol players
Xerez CD B players
Xerez CD footballers
Valencia CF Mestalla footballers
San Fernando CD players
Córdoba CF B players
Gimnàstic de Tarragona footballers
Hércules CF players
Celta de Vigo B players
CF Villanovense players
CD Ebro players
CE Sabadell FC footballers
CD Badajoz players
AD Ceuta FC players